Kalle Petter (Pekka) Huttunen (2 August 1871, Rantasalmi - 24 November 1932, Petrozavodsk) was a Finnish tenant farmer and politician. He was a member of the Parliament of Finland from 1907 to 1918, representing the Social Democratic Party of Finland (SDP). During the Finnish Civil War Huttunen sided with the Reds, and after the collapse of the Finnish Socialist Workers' Republic he fled to Soviet Russia. He later settled in the Karelian ASSR.

References

1871 births
1932 deaths
People from Rantasalmi
People from Mikkeli Province (Grand Duchy of Finland)
Social Democratic Party of Finland politicians
Members of the Parliament of Finland (1907–08)
Members of the Parliament of Finland (1908–09)
Members of the Parliament of Finland (1909–10)
Members of the Parliament of Finland (1910–11)
Members of the Parliament of Finland (1911–13)
Members of the Parliament of Finland (1913–16)
Members of the Parliament of Finland (1916–17)
Members of the Parliament of Finland (1917–19)
People of the Finnish Civil War (Red side)